Charcot Cove is a re-entrant in the coast of Victoria Land, Antarctica, between Bruce Point and Cape Hickey. It was discovered by the British National Antarctic Expedition, 1901–04, which named this feature for Dr. Jean-Baptiste Charcot, noted Arctic and Antarctic explorer.

References

 

Coves of Antarctica
Landforms of Victoria Land
Scott Coast